Mircea Minescu (born 17 June 1971) is a Romanian former football defender.

Honours
FC Ghimbav
Divizia C: 2003–04

References

1971 births
Living people
Romanian footballers
Association football defenders
Liga I players
Liga II players
Liga III players
AFC Dacia Unirea Brăila players
AFC Rocar București players
ASC Oțelul Galați players
People from Călărași County